Henry Bernard Behrman (June 27, 1921 – January 20, 1987) was a pitcher in Major League Baseball. He pitched from 1946 to 1949 with the Brooklyn Dodgers, Pittsburgh Pirates and New York Giants. He appeared in 5 games for the Dodgers during the 1947 World Series.

The right-handed pitcher had his best season as a rookie with the Brooklyn Dodgers in 1946 with an 11–5 record, a 2.93 earned run average and 150 innings pitched. On May 3, 1947, Behrman was traded with pitchers Kirby Higbe and Cal McLish, infielder Gene Mauch and catcher Dixie Howell to the Pittsburgh Pirates for outfielder Al Gionfriddo and $100,000. Then he was sent back to the Dodgers for cash on June 14 of that year. He was sold to the New York Giants on February 26, 1949, and closed his four-year career with them. He was 24–17 lifetime, with half of his wins coming in relief, a 4.40 earned run average and 19 saves.

References

External links

Major League Baseball pitchers
Brooklyn Dodgers players
Pittsburgh Pirates players
New York Giants (NL) players
1921 births
1987 deaths
Baseball players from New York (state)
Valdosta Trojans players
Durham Bulls players
Montreal Royals players
Oakland Oaks (baseball) players
San Francisco Seals (baseball) players
Oklahoma City Indians players
Toledo Mud Hens players
Charleston Senators players